There are several lakes named Mud Lake within the U.S. state of Kentucky.

 Butler Lake, also known as Mud Lake, Ballard County, Kentucky. 
 Mud Lake, Crittenden County, Kentucky.

References
 USGS-U.S. Board on Geographic Names

Lakes of Kentucky